K2-3, also known as EPIC 201367065, is a red dwarf with three known planets.  All are Super-Earths, and the outermost is in the habitable zone. It is on the borderline of being a late orange dwarf/K-type star, but because of its temperature, it is classified as a red dwarf (4,000 K is typically the division line between spectral class M and K).

At a distance of about 144 light-years, the star's proximity means it is bright enough to make it feasible for astronomers to study the planets' atmospheres to determine whether they are like Earth's atmosphere and possibly conducive to life.

Planetary system
K2-3 has at least three confirmed exoplanets, discovered in 2015

References

J11292037-0127173
K2-3 system
Leo (constellation)
M-type main-sequence stars
Planetary transit variables
Planetary systems with three confirmed planets